The Reformed Presbyterian Church of India is a historic confessional Presbyterian denomination in India, established in the 19th century by Scottish and Irish missionaries.

Origin 
The Reformed Presbyterian Church of India was a joint effort of the Reformed Presbyterian Church in Ireland and Scotland in 1823, and established 12 congregations in India by a team of three ministers, namely Alexander Crawford, James Glasgow and D. Mitchell. The present situation is that the church has one active presbytery. In the 1930 and 1940s the Bible Presbyterian Church helped to establish churches. The office located in Dehradun, Uttarakhand. The church subscribe the Westminster Confession of Faith, Westminster Larger and Shorter Catechism. The Reformed Presbyterian Church in India is a member of the World Reformed Fellowship, International Conference of Reformed Churches and the Evangelical Fellowship in India.

More recently the denomination's goal to establish several congregations in Uttarakhand, Uttar Pradesh, and New Delhi.

Structure 
The Reformed Presbyterian Church in India had two presbyteries in the past with one inactive at present:
Nav Jeevan Presbytery in Dehradun - also known as NJP
Reformed Bible Presbytery in New Delhi - also known as RBP (Inactive)
15 local congregations in Uttarakhand (8), Delhi (4), Uttar Pradesh (1), Rajasthan (1), Chattishgarh (1); 12 fellowship/church plants and various worship groups with 18 ordained ministers, 4 associate ministers from sister churches, 6 evangelists, and 1 women's ministry coordinator.

Theological education 
Presbyterian Theological Seminary

References

External links
Reformed Presbyterian Church in India
Reformiert Online
Official website
Presbyterian Theological Seminary

19th-century establishments in India
Presbyterian denominations in Asia
Presbyterianism in India